The Alder & Derryberry A is an American three-seat single-engine parasol monoplane sporting and training aircraft.  It was manufactured by C Alder & L E Derryberry in Abilene, Texas in 1935. The powerplant was identified as a Ford Model A engine.

Aircraft on display 
Sometime prior to 1980, the sole example was acquired disassembled and was stored in Tulsa as one of many pending restoration projects, however, after the owner suffered a stroke in 2004, the A-D was resold and restored to flying condition, receiving its certificate of airworthiness in 2008, before being donated to the city of Abilene in 2011, who have it on display at the local airport.

Specifications (Alder & Derryberry model A)

References

Citations

Bibliography

Homebuilt aircraft
Parasol-wing aircraft